Jules Verne's Mysterious Island is a 2012 adventure film directed by Mark Sheppard, very loosely based on Jules Verne's 1875 novel of the same name (L'Île mystérieuse). It premiered on Syfy on February 11, 2012. The film was released on DVD on May 29, 2012.

Plot summary
During the American Civil War, five northern POWs escape by hijacking a gas balloon. Drifting through the night, they awaken to find themselves marooned on a desert island, but they are not alone.

Cast
 Gina Holden as Julia "Jules" Fogg
 Lochlyn Munro as Captain Cyrus Harding
 Pruitt Taylor Vince as Gideon Spillett
 Susie Abromeit as Abby Fogg
 W. Morgan Sheppard as Captain Nemo
 Mark Sheppard as young Captain Nemo
 J. D. Evermore as Bonaventure Pencroft
 Caleb Michaelson as Hebert Brown
 Edrick Browne as Neb Nugent
 Lawrence Turner as Tom Ayrton

References

External links
 
 
 

2012 television films
2012 films
Films based on The Mysterious Island
Films set in 1865
Films about time travel
Science fantasy films
2010s adventure films
Syfy original films
2010s English-language films
2010s American films